Britain's Best Brain is a British game show that aired on Channel 5 from 28 October to 16 December 2009 and hosted by Jamie Theakston and Zoe Ball. It saw ordinary members of the public undertake various tasks, all scientifically designed to test different parts of the brain. The show ran every Wednesday and was aired from 28 October to 16 December 2009. The winner, crowned 'Britain's Best Brain 2009', was Matt Clancy, a 29-year-old marketing consultant from London.

Rounds
 Calculation: designed to test the parietal lobe.
 Memory: designed to test the temporal lobe.
 Recognition: designed to test the occipital lobe.
 Co-ordination: designed to test the cerebellum.
 Risk: designed to test the frontal lobe.

Qualifying leaderboard

Grand Final leaderboard

References

External links

2009 British television series debuts
2009 British television series endings
2000s British game shows
Channel 5 (British TV channel) original programming
English-language television shows
Television series by Banijay
Television series by Tiger Aspect Productions